Testing Positive 4 the Funk is the fourth installment of the George Clinton Family Series collection. The album was released in 1993 by P-Vine Records in Japan, and then was released later in the same year by AEM Records in the United States and Sequel Records in the U.K. This collection is noted for the inclusion of tracks such as a re-recording of "Live Up (To What She Thinks)" which was originally recorded by the soul quartet, The Fantastic Four. The track marked the debut of P-Funk vocalist Glenn Goins.

As with all of the Family Series CD's, the last track features George Clinton supplying background information of all of the songs featured on the CD.

Track Listing and Personnel

Live Up (To What She Thinks of Me)
Artist: Parliament (1975)  Producer: George Clinton
Drums: Tiki Fulwood
Bass: Bootsy Collins
Guitar: Michael Hampton, Gary Shider
Keyboard: Bernie Worrell
Background Vocals: Brandy (Telma Hopkins, Joyce Vincent)
Horns: Horny Horns
Vocals: Parliament, Glen Goins

Secrets
Artist: Sidney Barnes (1980)  Producer: Sidney Barnes
Drums: Kenny Colton
Bass: Donny Sterling
Guitar: Michael Hampton, Tony Thomas
Keyboard: Nestro Wilson
Vocals: Sidney Barnes

She Never Do's Things
Artist: Trey Lewd (1978)  Producer: Garry Shider
Drums: Tony Davis
Bass: Stevie Pannall
Guitar: Gary Shider, Andre Williams
Keyboard: David Spradley
Background Vocals: Brides, Parlet, Funkadelic, Parliament
  
Take My Love
Artist: Brides of Funkenstein (1977)  Producer: George Clinton
Drums: Tiki Fulwood
Bass: Bill Nelson
Guitar: Gary Cooper
Keyboard: Bernie Worrell
Vocals: Lynn Mabry, Dawn Silva

Just For Play
Artist: Brides of Funkenstein (1980)  Producer: Ron Ford, George Clinton
Drums: Kenny Colton
Bass: Jimmy Ali
Guitar: Jerome Ali
Keyboard: Nestro Wilson
Vocals: Brides

Off The Wall
Artist: Jessica Cleaves (1978)  Producer: Walter Morrison
All Instruments: Walter "Junie" Morrison
Vocals: Jessica Cleaves
Background Vocals: Junie Morrison

Get It On
Artist: Jimmy G (1981)  Producer: Ron Ford
Drums: Dean Ragland
Bass: Jimmy Giles
Guitar: Ron Ford
Keyboard: David Lee Chong

Triune
Artist: Junie Morrison (1978)  Producer: Walter Morrison
All Instruments: Walter "Junie" Morrison
Vocals: Junie Morrison

Superstar Madness
Artist: Muruga and The Soda Jerks (1980)  Producer: Robert Dennis
Drums: Muruga
Percussion: Muruga
Bass: Sly Stone
Bells: Louie Kabbabie
Guitar: Pat Larose, Muruga
Keyboard: Muruga
Vocals: Muruga, Shock-T

I Angle
Artist: Funkadelic (1980)  Producer: Ron Ford, George Clinton
Drums: Bootsy Collins
Bass: Ron Ford
Guitar: Tony Thomas, Eddie Hazel
Keyboard: David Lee Chong

Twenty Bucks
Artist: Brides of Funkenstein (1980)  Producer: Ron Dunbar
Strings/Horns: Wade Marcus

To Care
Artist: Four Tops (1978)  Producer: Ron Dunbar
Drums: Jerry Jones
Bass: Rodrick Chandler
Guitar: Eddie Willis
Keyboard: Rudi Robinson
  
Comin' Down From Your Love
Artist: Dick Savannah and Dwarf (1981)  Producer: Garry Shider
Drums: Merle
Bass: Pete Madary
Lead Guitar: Mike Finn 
Guitar: Nick Savannah
Vocals: Brides, Dwarf

Interview (Testing Positive 4 the Funk)
George Clinton

George Clinton (funk musician) albums
1993 albums